Hiram Braxton House is a historic house located near Snow Camp, Alamance County, North Carolina.

Description and history 
The original one-story V-notched log house was built about 1865. A side frame addition was built in 1884. The house has a standing seam metal roof and sits on a rock pier foundation.

It was added to the National Register of Historic Places on November 22, 1993.

References

Log houses in the United States
Houses on the National Register of Historic Places in North Carolina
Houses completed in 1884
Houses in Alamance County, North Carolina
National Register of Historic Places in Alamance County, North Carolina
Log buildings and structures on the National Register of Historic Places in North Carolina